The velvet-browed brilliant (Heliodoxa xanthogonys) is a species of hummingbird in the "brilliants", tribe Heliantheini in subfamily Lesbiinae. It is found in Brazil, Guyana, Suriname, and Venezuela.

Taxonomy and systematics

The velvet-browed brilliant has two subspecies, the nominate H. x. xanthogonys and H. x. williardi.

Description
 
Both sexes have a straight bill; the maxilla is blackish and the mandible orange with a dark tip. Both have a small white spot behind the eye.

Males of the nominate subspecies have a glittering golden- to emerald green central crown and a velvety blackish supercilium. The rest of the face, the hindneck, and the upperparts are dark golden green. The upper throat has a glittering violet-blue patch, the breast and belly are dark golden green, and the undertail coverts are greenish with narrow gray and rufous edges. The uppertail coverts and central tail feathers are bronze- to emerald green and the rest of the tail blackish green. Females are generally duller, with less iridescence, and do not have the black supercilium or the violet throat patch. They have a white "moustache", and most of the underparts are whitish with greenish spots. The tail feathers have white tips.

Males of subspecies H. x. williardi have longer wings and tail than the nominate but are otherwise similar. Females have less green and more white on their underparts, with no green spots on the belly. The tail is emerald green with broad white edges to the feathers.

Distribution and habitat

The nominate subspecies of velvet-browed brilliant is found in the highlands and tepuis where Venezuela, Guyana, and Brazil meet. In addition, there are a few records in Suriname. Subspecies H. x. williardi is found further south, on the tepuis of the southern Venezuela-northern Brazil border. The species inhabits the interior, edges, and clearings of sub-montane forest and also scrublands.

Behavior

Movement

The velvet-browed brilliant is believed to be sedentary but may make some seasonal elevational movements.

Feeding

The velvet-browed brilliant forages for nectar both low down and high in the canopy, but in the forest interior tends to stay low. It feeds by trap-lining, visiting a circuit of flowering plants, but also defends patches of flowers. In some seasons the sexes tend to separate and feed at different resources. In addition to nectar, the species also feeds on small insects.

Breeding

The velvet-browed brilliant's breeding season is apparently from January to March. It makes a saddle-type nest but nothing else is known about its breeding phenology.

Vocalization

The velvet-browed brilliant gives a "repeated nasal 'squank'" in flight. Another vocalization is "high-pitched drawn-out reeling trills" that rise and fall in pitch.

Status

The IUCN has assessed the velvet-browed brilliant as being of Least Concern. However, it has a restricted range and its population size is unknown and believed to be decreasing. It is locally abundant, and might be present in unexplored suitable habitat in the gaps among its scattered known locations.

References

velvet-browed brilliant
Birds of the Tepuis
velvet-browed brilliant
velvet-browed brilliant
velvet-browed brilliant
Taxonomy articles created by Polbot